Artix Entertainment, LLC is an independent video game developer and publisher founded by Adam Bohn in October 2002. It is best known for creating browser-based role-playing video games—including AdventureQuest, DragonFable, MechQuest, and AdventureQuest Worlds—using Adobe Flash. The company released its first title for iOS and Android devices in March 2011 and is  developing its first 3D game, AdventureQuest 3D, with the Unity game engine.

Games

AdventureQuest

AdventureQuest is Artix Entertainment's first project released in October 2002. It was meant to be called "Land Of Rising Evil" (Lore). It is also referred to as AdventureQuest Classic and The Original AdventureQuest. The game is also called Battleon due to its domain name. The game is set in the fictional world of "Lore", a tongue-in-cheek reference to the original game name, Lands of Rising Evil. While it is free to play, players may upgrade their characters to become AdventureQuest Guardians in order to receive exclusive in-game benefits.

WarpForce
Artix Entertainment's expansion to AdventureQuest, WarpForce, was released on July 17, 2009. It is a sequel to AdventureQuest, specifically relating to the recently completed five-year Devourer story arc in AdventureQuest, and there has been many crossovers between the two. It was built with the same game engine as AdventureQuest and, like AdventureQuest and Artix Entertainment's other single-player RPGs, is free to play with an optional one-time fee.

WarpForce is about the people of Lore (Humans, Dwarves, Elves, and a reptilian race called Drakel) who band together to create a fleet of starships powered by both magic and science, and zoom into outer space on missions to defeat a powerful and vast alien Network that is working to take over the universe. WarpForce takes ideas of traditional fantasy and incorporates them into a sci-fi universe, combining classic RPG elements with Artix Entertainment's trademark humor and a single-player storyline that unlocks as the player levels up, becoming more powerful by increasing stats and getting advanced equipment. Players will be able to choose from several races, dynamically change equipment during the animated battles, and also be able to combine their efforts in large wars and crossover events.

DragonFable

After AdventureQuest gained popularity, Artix Entertainment began to develop DragonFable and released it on June 9, 2006, set in the same world as AdventureQuest. It serves as a prequel to AdventureQuest and features younger versions of many of the same characters. But unlike AdventureQuest which featured a 2D background with the player's clicking the edges of the screen or doors to move around, DragonFable has a 2.5D movement system.

MechQuest

The third game MechQuest is a science fiction RPG set in the same timeline as AdventureQuest and DragonFable. MechQuest game system is a fusion between AdventureQuest and DragonFable. Players can either move around and fight on foot or pilot their own giant robot (called mechas in the game) to fight evil forces invading planets around the galaxy.

Nic Stransky complimented the graphics and simplicity of the game, but wrote that melee could feel inconsistent and that players may wish for more strategy.

AdventureQuest Worlds

AdventureQuest Worlds is the fourth major game made by Artix Entertainment. It is also the first multiplayer MMORPG created by the company. The game was released on October 10, 2008. Like its predecessors, it uses 2D-3D animation, although in a much simpler style to account for the increased server load and incorporates elements of all three previous games in its story. Unlike its predecessors, however, membership which is called Legend upgrades are not a one-time payment, but are instead purchased only for a certain number of months.

Set in an alternate universe where King Alteon and Sepulchure are at war, a war between good and evil; at this moment the player picks whether they want to join the forces of good or the forces of evil. The story's backdrop is set when during King Alteon and Sepulchure fight one on one which would likely decide the outcome of the war when Drakath (Once Sepulchure's prodigy) interrupts; wielding the new power of chaos Drakath kills Sepulchure and poisons King Alteon with chaos. Drakath declares he will destroy good and evil using the power of chaos and his 13 Lords of Chaos.

Play is similar to many MMORPGs, with players being able to chat and fight both in-game monsters and other players, in limited areas. Characters can be customized in appearance and gear, and character classes are available to train in game. Combat is not turn-based as in Artix Entertainment's previous RPGs, but is real-time and allows for group battles. Special events take place often, with many holidays being celebrated in-game. Other special events include wars, in which players collaborate to defeat enough "waves" of monsters to win the war over several days, and live events with guest stars like Voltaire, One-Eyed Doll, George Lowe, Paul and Storm, Jonathan Coulton, the cast of Ctrl+Alt+Del, Ayi Jihu, ArcAttack, They Might Be Giants, Andrew Huang, Mia J. Park, The Crüxshadows, Dreamers, and Michael Sinterniklaas as the voice of Deady.

EpicDuel
On December 2, 2009, Artix Entertainment announced that they were taking on a new MMORPG, EpicDuel, which they acquired from Epic Inventions LLC, who were developing the game independently. This is now their sixth major game and second major MMORPG. EpicDuel battle system is primarily based on player versus player gameplay.

HeroSmash
HeroSmash is a superhero-themed MMORPG that has entered beta testing, based on AdventureQuest Worlds. Beta stage is playable to all players in the game that possesses a Master account. The game was originally going to be called SuperHeroQuest, but the word "SuperHero" is a trademark of DC Comics and Marvel Comics which stopped Artix Entertainment from using the name.

As of 2014, the game is stated to be no longer in development.

Pony VS Pony
A puzzle game inspired from My Little Pony. The game was released in 2011.

AdventureQuest 3D
Artix Entertainment is currently working on their first 3D game, AdventureQuest 3D 

It features full cross-platform play, allowing players to access the game from a computer or mobile device.

In 2019, the game featured a collaboration with the nu metal band Korn. Korn performed an in-game concert, and special challenges and Korn-related items were released within the game in conjunction.

The game was initially playable in web browser using Unity Web Player. Due to Unity Web Player being no longer supported by most browsers and Unity itself, the game was transferred to Steam for Mac and Windows on March 8, 2016, and it was released for mobile around late October.

OverSoul
A Player versus player and Player versus environment game where players possess characters and use skill cards to battle. The game was created by Artix Entertainment's artist Milton Pool (better known as Nulgath or his earlier name Miltonius). Alpha Testing took place from September 13, 2012 to October 31, 2012. The game is currently in Beta Testing phase and is available to all players.

AdventureQuest Battle Gems
Battle Gems, Artix Entertainment's very first major mobile game released on iOS on March 18, 2014, followed by subsequent releases on Android and Facebook in the month of May. Battle Gems features Candy Crush like game play. Players are required to swipe over matching puzzle gems to launch battle attacks against monsters. Battle Gems features more than 150 fully animated monsters to fight, more than 450 quests to conquer, and various weapons, armor types, and pets to collect. The game is full of Artix Entertainment style puns, as well as recurring jokes from other Battleon games. Players can pay a one time fee to upgrade to the Founder status which, aside from giving them permanent status as Founder, also gives unlimited turns, unlimited energy (normally players can only fight a certain number of battles and then have to wait for it to refill), permanent gold boost (+30% gold earned), Skeleton key (unlocks everything players normally need gold keys for), and exclusive Dragon Knight armor, helm, weapon, and wings. Players can further link it to their master account and unlock the exclusive Dragon Knight class in AdventureQuest Worlds.

AdventureQuest Dragons
AdventureQuest Dragons is Artix Entertainment's second major mobile game developed in collaboration with French programmer "Orteil" who is best known for creating Cookie Clicker. AQ Dragons, which is aimed at multiple platforms released on Google Play Store on December 13, 2014 and the App Store on December 17 with a Web version planned for release in early 2015. AQ Dragons is an idle-game which features Cookie Clicker-styled gameplay. Players are required to tap on Dragon Eggs to hatch them and then collect gems (by tapping on them) in order to buy upgrades and evolve the baby dragons into titanic versions of themselves. Dragons features 12 different kinds of Dragons, each of which has their own artwork and animations along with their own story-lines and upgrades which the player can buy with their accumulated gems. The dragons need to be unlocked by means of Dragon Keys which are either available as part of the upgrades, or can be bought for a certain fee.  AQ Dragons features a Founder Status much like Battle Gems which the players can upgrade to by paying a one time fee. Founder players are granted permanent Founder status along with a large number of Dragon Keys and access to special items in AdventureQuest Worlds.

Fat Panda
Fat Panda was developed for Android mobile devices and released on the Google Play Store in 2011.
Currently the game is no longer available.

Master account mini-games
In early 2010, the BattleOn Portal was launched allowing players to connect all of their accounts to one master account. Work also began on a system where progress in portal mini-games could be saved on the master account. The first of these mini-games is BladeHaven. Beta testing for the game began on October 14, 2010. Only players who had upgraded in one of the company's other games could participate. The game was released to the public on November 5. In 2011, the staff had a mini-game developing contest and ended up making and releasing 10 mini-games on the portal site.

VelocityAE
Release on June 13, 2015, VelocityAE is a mobile game for Android and IOS. It is a retro arcade runner. It was secretly developed by Rolith, an employee of Artix Entertainment.
Currently the game is no longer available.

Other games
A test Guardian-only game known as ZardWars was developed in order to test how the servers would react to more than one database.

Another Guardian-only game called ArchKnight was made, though it was replaced by DragonFable before the game could be sufficiently developed, with the promise that ArchKnight would be worked into the new game. On February 19, 2010, the ArchKnight game and quest chain was continued and finished in DragonFable, and was made accessible only to those with upgrades in AdventureQuest or DragonFable.

Revenue
Payment in Artix games consists mostly of both a one-time payment or subscription, in the case of AdventureQuest Worlds and HeroSmash to unlock extra content. Most games also have "secondary currencies" (microtransactions) which are gained through offers or from spending real world money. These currencies can be used to buy in-game items.

In October 2010, the company launched its online shop, HeroMart.

AExtras
AExtras is a system of obtaining the previously payment-based secondary currencies in Artix Entertainment's games. It was first introduced in AdventureQuest Worlds before becoming available for all its major games and portal. In December 2010 it was discontinued in all but the Master Account System to encourage users to connect their accounts and earn rewards from there. Players can obtain free secondary currency or membership through the completion of third-party offers.

Other media
In November 2010, Artix Entertainment published its first novel, "The Dragon's Secret", written by AdventureQuest player, Lyra Trice Solis.

Artix Entertainment has also released three animated shorts. The first, Artix Vs. the Undead, was made as a teaser for the DoomWood storyline in DragonFable. The second short, Death from Above, was released as a sneak peek to the MechQuest storyline and was developed by J6 of the Artix Entertainment staff, and can be viewed in the game MechQuest. The third short labeled as "Nulgath vs. Dage" was created as a cutscene for OverSoul - a PvP orientated card game that follows Nulgath into another realm during the Nulgath vs. Dage War in AdventureQuest Worlds.

References

External links

 

 
Mobile game companies
Indie video game developers
Video game publishers
Land o' Lakes, Florida
Video game companies of the United States
American companies established in 2002
Video game companies established in 2002
Privately held companies based in Florida
2002 establishments in Florida